Abnoba (minor planet designation: 456 Abnoba), provisional designation , is a stony background asteroid from the central regions of the asteroid belt, approximately 40 kilometers in diameter. It was discovered on 4 June 1900, by astronomers Max Wolf and Arnold Schwassmann at the Heidelberg-Königstuhl State Observatory in southwest Germany. The asteroid was named after the Celtic deity Abnoba.

Orbit and classification 

Abnoba is a non-family asteroid from the main belt's background population. It orbits the Sun in the central main-belt at a distance of 2.3–3.3 AU once every 4 years and 8 months (1,701 days). Its orbit has an eccentricity of 0.18 and an inclination of 14° with respect to the ecliptic.

The body's observation arc begins at Bordeaux Observatory, eleven days after its official discovery observation at Heidelberg.

Physical characteristics 

In the SMASS classification, Abnoba is a stony S-type asteroid. Its stony composition was also confirmed by polarimetric observations in 2017.

Rotation period 

Several rotational lightcurves of Abnoba have been obtained from photometric observations since 2004. Analysis of the best-rated lightcurve from the Bigmuskie Observatory in Italy, gave a rotation period of 18.281 hours with a brightness amplitude of 0.32 magnitude.

Diameter and albedo 

According to the surveys carried out by the Infrared Astronomical Satellite IRAS, the Japanese Akari satellite and the NEOWISE mission of NASA's Wide-field Infrared Survey Explorer, Abnoba measures between 37.64 and 50.495 kilometers in diameter and its surface has an albedo between 0.1467 and 0.286.

The Collaborative Asteroid Lightcurve Link derives an albedo of 0.2537 and a diameter of 39.94 kilometers based on an absolute magnitude of 9.1.

Naming 

This minor planet was named after the Gaulish goddess Abnoba from Celtic mythology. The goddess was worshipped in the Black Forest of southern Germany, and known as "Diana Abnoba" to the Roman troops stationed in this region. The official naming citation was authored by Lutz D. Schmadel based on his own research.

Notes

References

External links 
 Asteroid Lightcurve Database (LCDB), query form (info )
 Dictionary of Minor Planet Names, Google books
 Asteroids and comets rotation curves, CdR – Observatoire de Genève, Raoul Behrend
 Discovery Circumstances: Numbered Minor Planets (1)-(5000) – Minor Planet Center
 
 

000456
Discoveries by Max Wolf
Discoveries by Friedrich Karl Arnold Schwassmann
Named minor planets
000456
19000604